Sphodromantis elegans is a species of praying mantis found in Ethiopia, Burkina Faso, Guinea, Mauritania, Niger, Senegal and the Congo River region.

See also
African mantis
List of mantis genera and species

References

elegans
Mantodea of Africa
Insects described in 1930